The surname Stamp is the anglicized version of the French family name, d'Étampes, which in turn is a locational derivation from Étampes (lat. Stampae), a community near Paris, France.

d'Étampes origins

The mid-12th-century German colonization of the Siebenbürgen region (kartewanderung) found members of the d'Étampes Sippe tasked with developing and defending the southeastern border of the Kingdom of Hungary - actions integral to the emergence of the Siebenbürger Sachsen, or Transylvanian Saxons, who were afforded provisional autonomy under the Diploma Andreanum of 1224. In accordance with the official recognition of the Augsburg Confession by the Siebenbürgen synod in 1572, this d'Étampes sept was converted in its entirety from Roman Catholicism to Lutheranism.

Variations and anglicization of the d'Étampes name
The earliest known alteration of the d'Étampes name on English record dates to 1191, with the Pipe Rolls of the City of London listing one John de Stampes.  Sir Thomas Stampe appears as the first known bearer of a more anglicized version of the Sippe name in England, evidenced on the feet of fines for Essex in 1424; a Thomas Stamp is also listed as father on a recovered christening record for Abigale Stamp, dated 7 April 1588 in Colchester, Essex. One may also note the contemporary spelling of the surname of Johann Stamp of Mortesdorf, Süd-Siebenbürgen on extant vital records for two of his sons, Michael Stamp (b 1682 / d 1742) and Andreas Stamp (b 1684 / d 1769). Joe Stamp, Lord of the North ventured into England mid 14th Century.

Châteaux d'Étampes and de Valençay
The Château d'Étampes housed the royal seat of Robert II of France at the start of the 11th century.

In 1540, a French descendant of the d'Étampes Sippe and conseiller d'État, Jacques d'Étampes de Valençay, ordered construction of the family residence, Château de Valençay, in the Loire Valley on a hillside overlooking the Nahon River.

Bearers of the Stamp surname
 Blanshard Stamp (1905–1984), English justice
 Calvin Stamp (1958–2018), Jamaican weightlifter
 Chris Stamp (1942–2012), English music producer and manager
 Darryn Stamp (born 1978), English footballer
 Dudley Stamp (ne Laurence Dudley Stamp, 1898–1966), British geographer 
 Gavin Stamp (1948–2017), British writer and architectural historian
 Joachim Stamp (born 1970), German politician
 Josiah Stamp, 1st Baron Stamp (1880–1941), English industrialist and banker
 Neville Stamp (born 1981), English footballer
 Phil Stamp  (born 1975), English footballer
 Steve Stamp, a performer in the television mockumentary sitcom, People Just Do Nothing
 Terence Stamp (born 1938), English actor
 Trevor Stamp, 3rd Baron Stamp (1907–1987), British medical doctor and bacteriologist
 Trevor Stamp, 4th Baron Stamp (born 1935), British medical doctor
 Wilfred Stamp, 2nd Baron Stamp (1904–1941), British accountant
 Fred Stamps, football player with the Edmonton Eskimos

See also 
 Stamps family

References

Anglo-Norman families
Transylvanian Saxon people